Judge Dredd: Crime Chronicles - Double Zero is a Big Finish Productions audio drama based on the character Judge Dredd in British comic 2000 AD. Unlike the main Judge Dredd audio dramas by Big Finish, the Crime Chronicles series acted more similarly to traditional audiobooks, with one actor/character narrating the story and summarizing most conversations, in this case Louise Jameson playing Judge Cassandra Anderson recalling a recent adventure. Occasionally, a second actor interjects as another character, in this case Toby Longworth voicing Judge Joe Dredd's dialogue. Ambient music and sound effects are also used in the production.

Like the majority of Dredd and Anderson's comic book stories, the Big Finish 2000 AD audio productions take place 122 years after its production date except in specific cases. This story takes place in 2132, at which point Anderson is 52 years old.

Plot
In Mega-City One, the metropolis that covers most of the North American east coast, Judge Cassandra Anderson is undergoing analysis by a "robo-shrink." Due to their psychic abilities and the strain that can result, Psi-Judges such as Anderson are required to undergo psychological evaluation following serious experiences or trauma. As requested, she recounts her most recent case.

Anderson comments that normal sleep is often difficult for her since, as a powerful psi-judge, she is sensitive to receiving information and visions when her defenses are lowered. Recently, she woke up in the night as a result of feeling a distinct psychic imprint. Her psychic instinct tells her to find Joe Dredd, who is on the trail of covert operatives from foreign mega-cities illegally entering MC1.

Anderson and Dredd learns the operatives are looking for a target called "Pariah" that might be located at Debbie Harry Block. Anderson finds a lone boy of ambiguous ethnicity between the ages of 8-12 and sees that his psychic aura is powerful, "practically nuclear." Anderson asks the boy about himself and he answers without speaking, transmitting images that convey he has been a test subject under the care of scientists and has no real family. The boy likes looking at the tall Statue of Justice that looks over Mega-City One, thinking of it as a protector.

Judge Mkimbe, a covert operative from Simba City, arrives and fires a laser blast, causing the Pariah Boy to panic and lash out with psychic energy. Anderson screams as the attack rips through her mind, then loses consciousness. The boy's attack knocks out the entire block's security and power, and he escapes.

When she awakes under medical care, it is hours later and Anderson's psychic powers are seemingly gone. She now rates a "Double Zero" on the scale according to both robot medics and other psi-judges, marking her as a psychic dead zone with no telepathic potential. Dredd suggests she stay in the infirmary, but Anderson insists she is still a judge and monitors his interrogation of Mkimbe. The Simba City judge claims diplomatic immunity and argues that if the MC1 judges knew what the Pariah truly was, they would have begged him to kill the boy. He describes the boy as "a demon, like the other mind-witches." Recognizing that Mkimbe shares the same fear and hatred of telepaths as many people from his city, Anderson enters the interrogation room to bluff him. Pretending that she can telepathically see his secrets, she promises to be discreet if he cooperates.

Mkimbe explains a bio-tech corporation in Luxor City created the "Pariah Project," meant to create a powerful psychic to act as a living weapon. The boy, he explains, was grown from the cells of 500 psychics and is powerful enough to be a telepathic atomic bomb, capable of neutralizing mental functions and psychic abilities over a massive radius. The boy's existence leaked, leading to raiders attacking the facility. The boy escaped and now many mega-cities want him, including the society East-Meg Two. Dredd decides to pursue the case but orders Anderson to stand down so she can recover.

Ignoring this, Anderson leaves to track the boy despite her lack of psychic abilities. Recalling the boy's feeling towards the Statue of Justice, she heads there and finds him hiding. The boy regrets having injured Anderson, then shows her images of being in pain while undergoing tests, indicating he does not want to cause pain himself and wishes to fix her mind. Crime mob psychics from the Rocco family arrive, looking for the boy. Knowing the boy needs time to recharge his full abilities, Anderson tells him to run and find Dredd while she holds off the gangsters. The boy does something that fills Anderson with a surge of energy, then runs. The Pariah boy is quickly grabbed by one of the gangsters who then demand Anderson's surrender.

After she drops her weapon, others arrive who had hired the Rocco family to abduct the boy, who they see as the "prototype" for a new breed of weapon. Realizing these are soviet judges from East-Meg Two, Anderson reveals this to the mobsters. As Mega-City One was once nearly destroyed by the soviet mega-cities during the "Apocalypse War," the mobsters open fire on the sov judges, killing them. Anderson tries to prevent the mobsters from taking the boy, but is shot in the chest. One of the gangsters raises his gun to shoot Anderson in the head but the Pariah boy convinces him she is already dead. As they leave with the boy, she loses consciousness.

Anderson wakes up as a robo-doc treats her wound and stitches her up. Anderson realizes her powers are slowly rebuilding thanks to the boy's psychic surge. After two hours of circling above the city, Anderson finally locks onto a "think-easy," a hidden mob safehouse shielded against most types of psychic activity. She and Dredd raid the building, finding an access tunnel. Journeying into an old sewer, they find the gangster attempting to force the Pariah boy into a getaway vehicle. A fight ensues and Anderson feels the boy reach out to her mind again, enhancing the repair of her abilities even while fighting panic. Anderson helps him focus and the boy mentally attacks the gangster holding him hostage.

With the gangsters disabled, Dredd reveals that the Judges have found out the Pariah was responsible for hundreds of deaths in the city of Luxor. Since the boy is now weakened and vulnerable from using his powers, Dredd considers killing him before he can hurt anyone else. Anderson argues that this boy is not Dredd's old nemesis Owen Krysler, "The Judge Child," and that he needs guidance and protection. Dredd concedes that judges are meant to protect citizens, not only to punish. The child is taken into protective custody by Psi-Division.

Psi-Judge Anderson, her power now fully restored, finishes her story to the robo-shrink and remarks that she knows her desire to protect the boy isn't wrong. When told the Council of Five are still deciding if Anderson should be disciplined for her actions during this case, Anderson dismisses it and says she will continue to protect the innocent - no matter who they are.

Cast
Louise Jameson - Judge Anderson
Toby Longworth - Judge Dredd

External links
Big Finish Productions

2010 audio plays
Judge Dredd